Roger Bonair-Agard is a poet and performance artist. He has made numerous television and radio appearances, has led countless workshops and lectures, and has performed his poetry at many US universities as well as at international festivals in Germany, Switzerland, Milan, and Jamaica. He has been accused of sexual abuse by multiple people, including other poets.

Biography

Born in Trinidad, Bonair-Agard moved to the United States in 1987, intending to begin university and eventually pursue law, but finding himself "instead exploring the seediest sides of New York City life". He studied Political Science at Hunter College, and was about to take the Law School Admission Test when he decided to concentrate on poetry rather than a law career.

He was a member of the 1997 Nuyorican Poets Cafe Poetry Slam team and later coached the 1998 Nuyorican Poets Cafe Poetry Slam team, which went on to win the National Poetry Slam Championship that year in Austin, TX.

He then co-founded the louderARTS Project and has been on the 1999, 2001, 2003, 2004, 2005, 2006 and 2007 louderARTS Poetry Slam teams. In 1999, he won the individual competition at the National Poetry Slam. He was formerly the Artistic Director for louderARTS. He has also been Adjunct Professor in the Creative Writing Department at Fordham University. Over the past decade he has worked with the youth at Urban Word in New York City, at Volume in Ann Arbor and with poetry youth organizations in Seattle, San Francisco, and the Adirondack Valley, NY. Bonair-Agard is also a Cave Canem fellow, and has studied under Yusef Komunyakaa, Cornelius Eady, Marilyn Nelson, Toi Derricotte, and Patricia Smith.

He currently teaches creative writing with the Free Write Arts & Literacy Program at the Cook County, Illinois Temporary Juvenile Detention Center in Chicago, Illinois.

Sexual misconduct allegations 
Bonair-Agard published a poem to his personal website in 2010, written in first-person, about a man assaulting a woman.

In 2013, one of Bonair-Agard's coworkers at Young Chicago Authors accused him of rape. This allegation brought about public concern that the organization was a danger to the youth it served.

A survivor's account of abuse by Bonair-Agard is published in the 2017 Rutgers University Press book Killing Poetry: Blackness and the Making of Slam and Spoken Word Communities by Javon Johnson. 

On December 21, 2020, the organization Free Write Arts & Literacy released this statement, "In 2016, Free Write leadership promoted Roger to a position of leadership where he remained until early December 2020 when his employment was terminated. For six years, we chose not to stand in solidarity with survivors of harm and instead protected an abuser. We told ourselves that the internal work we were doing to design policy and structures to account for the harm was “transformative” when really it was insufficient and cowardly, with no public accountability offered to the community. This caused further harm caused to talented, trusted Free Write staff members and community partners, some of whom unwittingly found themselves in proximity to the employee while simply doing their jobs with Free Write, while others who strongly advocated for accountability were ignored or placated." The organization added to their statement on February 17, 2021. 

On February 24, 2021, another poet and YCA coworker of Bonair-Agard's came forward to accuse him of rape. 

In March 2021, Chicago Public Schools suspended its partnership with Young Chicago Authors, due to the allegations against Bonair-Agard, as well as the outcries from the poetry community, including a statement from the president of Button Poetry, alleging that leadership within the YCA organization knew Bonair-Agard was dangerous and did not act. This triggered journalism by Chicago Reader that logged two decades of survivors' accounts of abuse by predators affiliated with YCA.

Bibliography
Where Brooklyn At?, 2016, Aquarius Press
Bury My Clothes, 2013, Haymarket Books
Gully, 2010, Peepal Tree Press
Tarnish and Masquerade, 2006, Cypher Books
Burning Down the House, 2000, Soft Skull Press, co-authored with Stephen Colman, Guy Lecharles Gonzalez, Alix Olson, and Lynne Procope

Discography
List in a Valley of Bone: New and Selected Poem Recordings (2009)
Chantuel
NYC Slams
5 Past 13

Filmography
The 2000 National Poetry Slam Finals - 2000, Poetry Slam Inc.
Poetry slam - 1999, Princeton: Films for the Humanities & Sciences (with David Deutsch,  Elizabeth Farnsworth, and Ariana Waynes).

References

External links
The louderARTS Project
Roger's Journal
Audio of "How Do We Spell Freedom?," "Southpaw," "Andrew Jackson's Statue, French Quarter New Orleans" and "Soul" (among others) on Indiefeed Performance Poetry Channel

Trinidad and Tobago poets
Trinidad and Tobago emigrants to the United States
Hunter College alumni
Year of birth missing (living people)
Poets from Illinois
Violence against women in the United States
African-American poets
American male poets
Living people
Stonecoast MFA alumni
21st-century African-American people
African-American male writers